Thalavadi taluk is a taluk of Erode district of the Indian state of Tamil Nadu. Thalavadi became a separate taluk within Erode district by the bifurcation of Sathyamangalam, Modakurichi and Kodumudi taluks on 8 March 2016.

The new taluk has the control over the same geographic entity of the Thalavadi revenue block, with Thalavadi town as its headquarters. Thalavadi taluk falls under the Gobichettipalayam Revenue division.

Demographics
According to the 2011 census, the erstwhile Sathyamangalam taluk had a population of 331,993 with 166,964 males and 165,029 females. There were 988 women for every 1,000 men. The taluk had a literacy rate of 60.43%. Child population in the age group below 6 years were 14,118 males and 13,561 females. As of bifurcation, the present Thalavadi Taluk has a population of ~63,399.

Geography
Even though the population is lesser in this area, the rules have been relaxed considering the welfare of tribal communities living in this inhospitable area. Much of the area is covered by Sathyamangalam Tiger Reserve.

Places
Populated places within the taluk include: Hasanur, Thalavadi, Dhimbam, Germalam, Arepalaya, Talamalai, Gettavadi, Igalore, Jora Hosur, Doddagajanur, Gumatapura, Marur, Kodipuram, Doddapura, Kalmandipuram, Erahanahalli and Thiganare.

References

External links
 

Taluks of Erode district